The Greensburg Downtown Historic District is a national historic district located at  Greensburg, Decatur County, Indiana.  It encompasses 67 contributing buildings and 3 contributing objects in the central business district of Greensburg. The district developed between about 1854 and 1945, and includes notable examples of Italianate, Queen Anne, and Classical Revival style architecture.  Located in the district are the separately listed Decatur County Courthouse and Knights of Pythias Building and Theatre.  Other notable buildings include the Palmer Building (c. 1860), YMCA (1915), City Hall (1874), U.S Post Office, George E. Erdmann Building (1908), .

It was listed on the National Register of Historic Places in 1995.

References

External links

Historic districts on the National Register of Historic Places in Indiana
Queen Anne architecture in Indiana
Neoclassical architecture in Indiana
Italianate architecture in Indiana
Geography of Decatur County, Indiana
National Register of Historic Places in Decatur County, Indiana
1995 establishments in Indiana